In 2005, the British author and Holocaust denier David Irving was arrested for Holocaust denial in Austria. In early 2006, he was convicted and given a sentence of three years, of which he served 13 months after a reduction of his prison sentence.

Actions

In 1989, David Irving made two speeches in Austria, one in Vienna and the other in Leoben denying the Holocaust. The speeches included a call for an end to the "gas chambers fairy tale"  and claimed that Nazi leader Adolf Hitler had helped Europe's Jews and that the Holocaust was a "myth".

Irving was arrested driving in Southern Austria and contravening a ban on entering the country.  Irving had previously been fined in Germany, for denying the existence of Auschwitz gas chambers.

Arrest
On 11 November 2005, the Austrian police in the southern state of Styria, acting under a 1989 warrant, arrested Irving. Four days later, he was charged by state prosecutors with the speech crime of "trivialising the Holocaust". His application for bail was denied on the grounds that he would flee or repeat the offence. He remained in jail awaiting trial. On 20 February 2006 Irving pleaded guilty to the charge of "trivialising, grossly playing down and denying the Holocaust".

Sentencing
Before Irving's sentencing hearing, he stated through his lawyer that he had changed his views and his ways. At the trial, Judge Liebtreu quoted numerous statements of Irving's, including "there were no gas chambers at Auschwitz" and "it makes no sense to transport people from Amsterdam, Vienna and Brussels 500 kilometres to Auschwitz simply to liquidate them when it can be more easily done 8 km from the city where they live". Irving informed Judge Liebtreu that he "regretted the formulation".

Towards the end of the hearing, Irving again publicly recanted, saying that "I've changed my views. I spoke then about Auschwitz and gas chambers based on my knowledge at the time, but by 1991 when I came across the Eichmann papers, I wasn't saying that any more and I wouldn't say that now. The Nazis did murder millions of Jews. ..I made a mistake by saying there were no gas chambers, I am absolutely without doubt that the Holocaust took place. I apologise to those few I might have offended though I remain very proud of the 30 books I have written". However, Irving continued to insist that Hitler knew nothing of the death camps, and that "The figure of six million killed Jews is just a symbolic number".

Michael Klackl, the prosecuting attorney, stated: 

The judge, Peter Liebtreu, summarised: 

At the end of the one-day hearing, Irving was sentenced to three years' imprisonment in accordance with the Austrian Federal Law on the prohibition of National Socialist activities (officially Verbotsgesetz, "Prohibition Statute") for having denied the existence of gas chambers in Nazi concentration camps in several lectures held in Austria in 1989. Irving sat motionless as Liebtreu asked Irving if he had understood the sentence, to which Irving replied "I'm not sure I do" before being bundled out of the court by Austrian police. Later, Irving declared himself shocked by the severity of the sentence. He reportedly had already purchased a plane ticket home to London.

After sentencing
After the sentencing, Liebtreu told the audience that "The court did not consider the defendant to have genuinely changed his mind. The regret he showed was considered to be mere lip service to the law".  Within days of sentencing Irving, talking from prison, reverted to a strongly antisemitic position.

On 28 February, Irving once again questioned the Holocaust, asking "Given the ruthless efficiency of the Germans, if there was an extermination programme to kill all the Jews, how come so many survived?" He claimed that the number of people gassed in Auschwitz was relatively small, and that his earlier claims that there had been no gassing at all had been a "methodological error". According to Irving, "You could say that millions died, but not at Auschwitz". Within hours, the Austrian government reacted by barring Irving from further communication with the media.

Time in prison
Deborah Lipstadt, upon hearing of Irving's sentence to three years' imprisonment, said, "I am not happy when censorship wins, and I don't believe in winning battles via censorship... The way of fighting Holocaust deniers is with history and with truth".

Concerning the Austrian 'Prohibition Statute,' the Austrian Federal Ministry for Foreign Affairs insisted that it conforms with international law and international human rights standards, and that it is not contrary to Article 10 of the European Convention on Human Rights 1950, that being a statute "...necessary in a democratic society (inter alia)... for the prevention of disorder or crime,... [and]... for the protection of the rights of others".

Release
Both Irving, hoping to have the verdict overturned, and the Austrian prosecutor, calling for a longer sentence, served appeals on 22 April 2006. The Austrian Supreme Court considered Irving's appeal but ultimately ruled against him in September 2006. The appeal over the length of sentence was heard and concluded on 20 December. The court replaced two-thirds of Irving's jail sentence with probation. Since he had already served the balance of his sentence in jail, he was released from prison.
On 21 December 2006, Irving was technically "expelled" from Austria; he was banned from ever returning to the country again. Upon Irving's arrival in the UK he reaffirmed his position, stating that he felt  "no need any longer to show remorse" for his Holocaust views.

Controversy
His imprisonment caused some controversy and has been criticised on the grounds of free speech issues. The German historian Hans-Ulrich Wehler supported Irving's imprisonment under the grounds that "the denial of such an unimaginable murder of millions, one third of whom were children under the age of 14, cannot simply be accepted as something protected by the freedom of speech". By contrast Deborah Lipstadt argued that Irving should not be imprisoned for expressing views that she finds odious and wrong. Opponents of Irving's imprisonment argue that free speech should be applied to everyone regardless of their viewpoints and that it is a slippery slope to imprison someone due to the lack of factual accuracy or unpopularity of their opinions. It has also been argued that by imprisoning Irving the Austrian courts made a martyr out of Irving and did more damage than good, and that it would have been better to simply "let him go home and let him continue talking to six people in a basement", and "let him fade into obscurity where he belongs".

References

David Irving
Holocaust denial in Austria
2005 in law
2006 in law
2005 in Austria
2006 in Austria